Shin'yō Maru may refer to the following ships:
 , World War II era Japanese cargo ship
 , World War II era Japanese cargo ship and hellship
 , Japanese passenger liner

See also
 Shin'yō Maru incident

Ship names